Reeves was the most prominent firm of monumental masons (tombstone carvers) in Bath, Somerset. They flourished from c. 1778 to the 1860s. They often signed their work with "Reeves," or occasionally "Reeves & Son of Bath" when commissioned outside of Bath. One memorial is in the Grade I-listed City of London church St. Magnus the Martyr.

List of works

 1786, Thomas Stokes, marble tablet in St Marys Church Yate
 1799, Nathaniel Osborne, marble tablet in St Marys Church, Tormarton
 1807, Simon Wayte marble tablet in Church of St Mary, Rodbourne Cheney, Swindon
 1820, Thomas Preston Esq. (d.1820) and wife Jane (d.1823), their daughters, and many subsequent entries until 1848. It features the willow tree motif, and is in the City of London Church of St Magnus-the-Martyr.
 1841, George Whittington marble tablet in Holy Trinity Church, Cold Ashton
c.1847, Benjamin Plim Bellamy Monument in Bath Abbey Cemetery
c.1847, Samuel Maxwell Hinds Memorial in Bath Abbey Cemetery
c.1847, Joseph Chaning Pearce Memorial in Bath Abbey Cemetery
 1851, William Bevan Gwyn monument in Church of St Cain, Llangain

Contemporary Monumental Masons in Bath
Rogers of Bath
Tucker, Mason
Treasure, Mason
White

References

Companies based in Bath, Somerset
Stonemasons
Monumental masons